Battersea Greyhound Track was a greyhound racing track in Battersea, south west London, within the London Borough of Wandsworth. It is not to be confused with the Wandsworth Stadium.

Opening
The track opened in 1933 and was located near Lombards Road and Vicarage Crescent on the south bank of the River Thames. It had an official address of number 15 Lombard Road.

Greyhound racing
Independent (unaffiliated to a governing body) greyhound racing took place until 1936. An application to reopen it in 1939 was objected to by the military as the entrance was too near to the railway bridge and sabotage was feared. There is speculation that the track could have been affiliated to the Greyhound Racing Association at some stage and that it raced under National Greyhound Racing Club rules but there is no evidence of this in the track lists of 1934 and 1935.

Today
The site of the track was very close to the modern day Fred Wells Gardens.

References

Defunct greyhound racing venues in the United Kingdom
Defunct sports venues in London
1930 establishments in England
1939 disestablishments in England
Defunct greyhound racing venues in London
Greyhound racing in London